Dmitry Sergeyevich Prishchepa (born 21 June 2001) is a Belarusian football player who plays as a left back for Russian club Rotor Volgograd on loan from Krylia Sovetov Samara. He also played as centre back in the past.

Club career
In 2019 he was loaned to Zenit Saint Petersburg, where he played for the reserve squad.

On 18 February 2022, Prishchepa was loaned to Russian Football National League side Veles Moscow for a term of one year. On 25 January 2023, he moved on a new loan to Rotor Volgograd.

Career statistics

References

External links

2001 births
Footballers from Minsk
Living people
Belarusian footballers
Association football defenders
Belarus youth international footballers
Belarus under-21 international footballers
FC Minsk players
FC Zenit-2 Saint Petersburg players
PFC Krylia Sovetov Samara players
FC Veles Moscow players
FC Rotor Volgograd players
Belarusian Premier League players
Russian First League players
Russian Second League players
Belarusian expatriate footballers
Expatriate footballers in Russia
Belarusian expatriate sportspeople in Russia